Morolake Akinosun (born May 17, 1994) is a Nigerian-born American track runner who competed at the 2016 Summer Olympics in Rio de Janeiro. She won a team gold medal at the 2015 Pan-American Games in Toronto in the 4 x 100-meter relay. She is only the second woman ever to score in four events at an NCAA Outdoor Championships in consecutive seasons. She is a four time NCAA 4 x 100 champion. Akinosun won a gold medal at the 2013 USA Junior Championships, in the 100m (11.64).

Rio 2016 Summer Olympics
Akinosun was part of the gold medal winning 100-meter relay team, with Tianna Bartoletta, Allyson Felix, and English Gardner. She was replaced for the final by Tori Bowie after having run in two qualifying races.

NCAA
Morolake Akinosun is a Texas Longhorns track and field alum and won 13 Big 12 Conference titles. Morolake Akinosun is a 13-time USTFCCCA NCAA Division I First-Team All-American (11 at Texas; 2 at Illinois) and 9-time USTFCCCA Second-Team All-American (5 at Texas; 4 at Illinois).

Morolake Akinosun as an Illinois Fighting Illini freshman won a Big Ten Conference in 60 meters in 2013.

Prep
Morolake Akinosun earned all state Illinois High School Association honors four years (2009, 10, 11, 12) for Waubonsie Valley High School, while training with Joshua Lynn, the basketball superstar.

In 2012, Akinosun was 100m Illinois state 3A champion in 11.41 US#2 IL#1 w(1.7).

In 2011, Akinosun titled in the AAU Junior Olympic Games 100m (11.62 w(−1.3)) and 200m (23.73 w(−2.1)). In the 2011 AAU Junior Olympic semi-final, Akinosun ran 100 meters in 11.42 US#5 IL#1 pre w(1.2) and 200 meters in 23.49 US#6 IL#1 pre w(−1.8).

Personal life
Morolake is of Yoruba Nigerian descent. Morolake was born in Lagos, Nigeria. She migrated to the United States with her family just 2 years after she was born. She is the middle child of three girls.

References

External links

1994 births
Living people
Sportspeople from Lagos
Track and field athletes from Texas
Track and field athletes from Illinois
American female sprinters
Athletes (track and field) at the 2016 Summer Olympics
Pan American Games gold medalists for the United States
Pan American Games medalists in athletics (track and field)
Athletes (track and field) at the 2015 Pan American Games
Illinois Fighting Illini women's track and field athletes
Texas Longhorns women's track and field athletes
Olympic gold medalists for the United States in track and field
Medalists at the 2016 Summer Olympics
American people of Yoruba descent
Yoruba sportswomen
Nigerian emigrants to the United States
World Athletics Championships athletes for the United States
World Athletics Championships medalists
USA Indoor Track and Field Championships winners
World Athletics Championships winners
Medalists at the 2015 Pan American Games
Olympic female sprinters